Ivan Lukačević (1711–12), known as Podgoričanin, was a Russian Imperial captain of Serb origin from Podgorica (now in Montenegro) that participated in planning of a Balkan Orthodox uprising with Russian aid against the Ottoman Empire. He was sent with Russian colonel of Serb origin, Mikhail Miloradovich (presumably the grandfather of Mikhail Miloradovich), to deliver documents issued by emperor Peter the Great (and written by diplomat Sava Vladislavich, another Serb in Russian service) on 3 March 1711 that called the Balkan Orthodox to rise up against the Ottomans during the Pruth River Campaign. Miloradović and Lukačević arrived at Cetinje and delivered them to metropolitan Danilo, who had them read at a Montenegrin church assembly. This was the first Russian delegation to Montenegro. Danilo, Miloradović and Lukačević then organized military operations (such as the attack on Nikšić). In September 1712, Lukačević left Montenegro and headed for Russia. However, he was left in Berlin.

See also
 Andrei Miloradovich
 Nikolay Depreradovich
 Ivan Adamovich
 Ilya Mikhailovich Duka
 Avram Ratkov
 Nikolay Bogdanov
 Matija Zmajević
 Semyon Zorich
 Peter Tekeli
 Georgi Emmanuel
 Simeon Piščević
 Jovan Albanez
 Jovan Šević
 Anto Gvozdenović
 Fedor Yakovlevich Mirkovich
 Marko Ivelich

References

Sources

Year of birth unknown
18th-century Serbian people
18th-century military personnel from the Russian Empire
Serbian military leaders
Imperial Russian Army personnel
People from the Russian Empire of Serbian descent
18th-century deaths
Serbs from the Ottoman Empire
Military personnel from Podgorica
Serbs of Montenegro
Emigrants from the Ottoman Empire to the Russian Empire
Russian people of Serbian descent